Alaungsithu or Sithu I (also Cansu I; 1090–1167) was king of Pagan Dynasty of Burma (Myanmar) from 1112/13 to 1167. Sithu's reign was a prosperous one in which Pagan was an integral part of in-land and maritime trading networks. Sithu engaged in a massive building campaign throughout the kingdom, which included colonies, forts and outposts at strategic locations to strengthen the frontiers, ordination halls and pagodas for the support of religion, as well as reservoirs, dams and other land improvements to assist the farmers. He also introduced standardized weights and measures throughout the country to assist administration as well as trade. He presided over the beginning of a transition away from the Mon culture toward the expression of a distinctive Burman style.

Sithu is remembered a peripatetic king who traveled extensively throughout his realm, built monuments and nurtured Theravada Buddhism with acts of piety.

Early life
Sithu was born Zeyathura Sithu to Saw Yun (son of King Saw Lu) and Shwe Einthi (daughter of King Kyansittha) on 17 January 1090. (According to Zatadawbon Yazawin, he was born on 13 December 1089.) The chronicles do not agree on the dates regarding his life and reign. The table below lists the dates given by the four main chronicles.

At Sithu's birth, Kyansittha, who thought that he had no son, was so delighted that he crowned the infant as king, and presented the baby to the people saying "Behold your king! Henceforth, I reign only as his regent." (It turned out that Kyansittha did have a son by a wife during one of his exiles in the 1070s. That son, Yazakumar, made no claims of the throne.)

Accession
Sithu faced no opposition to the throne after his grandfather, Kyanzittha, died in 1112. He was the great grandson of Anawrahta on his father's side. His coronation was presided by an aging Primate Shin Arahan who also presided the coronations of the two predecessor kings, and adviser to three previous kings. Upon ascending the throne, Sithu assumed the royal style Sri Tribhuwanaditya Pavarapandita Sudhammaraja Mahadhipati Narapatisithu.

Reign

Administration
The early part of Sithu's reign was spent repressing revolts, especially in Tenasserim and north Arakan. A Pali inscription found at Mergui (Myeik) is evidence that Tenasserim then paid allegiance to the Pagan monarchy. In north Arakan, a usurper (Kahton, lord of Thets) had driven out the rightful heir, who fled to Pagan, where he subsequently died. Pagan's initial attempt to restore the rightful heir Letya Min Nan—a combined land and seaborne invasion—failed but the second attempt in 1118 succeeded. (The Arakanese chronicles report the date as 1103.) Letya Min Nan, in gratitude, repaired the Buddhagaya shrine in the honor of his overlord Sithu.

Sithu traveled far and wide throughout his dominions, building many works of merit. These pious pilgrimages form the main theme of the chronicles of his reign. He reportedly sailed as far south as Malaya and Bengal in the west. Like his great-grandfather Anawrahta, he also traveled to Nanzhao Kingdom. There was apparently much disorder during his long absences from the capital.

The rulings given at his court, some of which by himself, once existed in a collection, the Alaungsithu Hpyatton.

Economy
Sithu's reign was a prosperous one in which Pagan was an integral part of in-land and maritime trading networks. Sithu engaged in a massive building campaign throughout the kingdom, which included colonies, forts and outposts at strategic locations to strengthen the frontiers, ordination halls and pagodas for the support of religion, as well as reservoirs, dams and other land improvements to assist the farmers. He also introduced standardized weights and measures throughout the country to assist administration as well as trade. The standardization provided an impetus for the monetization of Pagan's economy, the full impact of which however would not be felt until later in the 12th century.

In the 1150s, Sithu visited the court of Parakramabahu I in Sri Lanka appointing an ambassador. Burmese chronicles state that Sithu married a daughter of Parakramabahu. However, the Sri Lankan chronicle Cūḷavaṃsa records that Sithu caught sight of a letter addressed to the King of Cambodia and attempted to stop Sri Lanka's elephant trade with Cambodia. Instead of a diplomatic marriage, the chronicle states that Bagan captured a lesser Sinhalese princess, sent by Parakramabahu, on her way to Cambodia sparking a brief naval war.

Culture

The wealth funded the temple building boom that began in his grandfather's reign. However, a noticeable shift from the Mon architecture to a Burman-style architecture began. The temples built during his reign include the last examples of Mon architecture at Pagan as well as the earliest efforts to construct Burman-style temples, the most famous example of which is the Thatbyinnyu. He also built the Shwegugyi Temple, next to the palace.

Fall out with Min Shin Saw
His eldest son Min Shin Saw was the heir-apparent for most of Sithu's reign. In the 1160s, the king banished Min Shin Saw for the latter's ill treatment of people. Having sent Min Shin Saw a small town about 90 miles north of Pagan, Sithu then appointed the second son Narathu as heir apparent.

Death

In 1167, Sithu fell ill. Narathu, who could not wait to be king, moved the king from the palace to the nearby Shwegugyi Temple. When he regained consciousness, Sithu was furious that he had been set aside. Narathu came in and smothered the king with bedclothes.

Sithu is posthumously remembered in Burmese history as Alaungsithu (lit. Sithu the Maitreya Buddha) for his numerous pious deeds. The devout Buddhist king was also inducted into the pantheon of Burmese animist nats as Min Sithu. (All but one of the nat sprits in the pantheon were murdered.)

Notes

References

Bibliography
 
 
 
 
 
 
 
 
 
 
 
 
 
 
 

Pagan dynasty
Assassinated Burmese people
1090 births
1167 deaths
Deaths from asphyxiation
12th-century Burmese monarchs
11th-century Burmese people